Langshaw may refer to:

 Langshaw, Queensland, a locality in the Gympie Region, Queensland, Australia
 Stanley Langshaw ( – 1936), English rugby league player